Anatalavis is genus of prehistoric birds related to ducks and geese, perhaps in particular the magpie-goose. The species Anatalavis rex – formerly placed in Telmatornis – is known from the Hornerstown Formation (Late Cretaceous or Early Paleocene, some 66 million years ago) of New Jersey. Anatalavis oxfordi was described based on fossils found in the Eocene (Ypresian age) London Clay (about 55 mya) at Walton-on-the-Naze, England.

References
 Dyke, GJ (2000) "The fossil waterfowl (Aves: Anseriformes) from the Tertiary of England," J. Vertebr. Paleontol. 20: 39A.   
 Dyke, GJ (2001) "The fossil waterfowl (Aves: Anseriformes) from the Eocene of England,"  American Museum Novitates No. 3354, 15 pp.

Bird genera
Anseriformes
Anseranatidae
Paleogene birds
Prehistoric birds of North America
Fossil taxa described in 1915